The Warrington Circulating Library of Warrington, England, was a subscription library established in 1760. It became part of the Warrington Museum in 1848. Supporters included Joseph Priestley.

Notes

References

Further reading
 

Libraries in Lancashire
History of Warrington
1760 establishments in England
Subscription libraries in England